The 2006 San Marino GP2 Series round were a pair of motor races held on 22 and 23 April 2006 at the Autodromo Enzo e Dino Ferrari in Imola as part of the GP2 Series. It was the second round of the 2006 GP2 season.

Classification

Qualifying

Feature Race

Sprint Race

Standings after the round

Drivers' Championship standings

Teams' Championship standings

 Note: Only the top five positions are included for both sets of standings.

Notes

References

External links 
 Official website of GP2 Series

GP2
San Marino
GP2